Noventa Vicentina is a town and comune in the province of Vicenza, Veneto, northern Italy. It is west of SP247 provincial road. Noventa Vicentina was first inhabited by the Romans in the 1st century AD. Afterward in the early 1500s, the town was settled again by some Venetian Aristocrats. Noventa spent some time under the Republic of Venice but later became part of Austro Hungarian Empire. In 1863 Noventa Vicentina was annexed by Italy and has ever since been under the Italian Republic.

Main Attractions
Villa Barbarigo.
Chiesa Parrocchiale dei SS. Vito, Modesto e Crescenzia
Piazza IV Novembre, with the Town Hall, Duomo, Porticoes,the column, and the fountain.
Villa Manin Canterella
Teatro Modernissimo
Villa Arnaldi Prosdocimi
Villa Albrizzi
Villa San Floriano
Palazzo Stefani

Images

Twin towns
Noventa Vicentina is twinned with:

  Asiago, Italy

Sources 
(Google Maps)

References 

Cities and towns in Veneto